Shahrestaneh (also Romanized as Shahrestāneh) is a village in Khorram Rud Rural District, in the Central District of Tuyserkan County, Hamadan Province, Iran. At the 2006 census, its population was 888, in 231 families.

References 

Populated places in Tuyserkan County